The Arizona State Sun Devils college football team competes as part of the National Collegiate Athletic Association (NCAA) Division I Football Bowl Subdivision (FBS), representing the Arizona State University in the South Division of the Pac-12 Conference (Pac-12). Since the establishment of the team in 1897, Arizona State has appeared in 32 bowl games.  With a win in their 2019 bowl game, the Sun Bowl, the all-time bowl record stands at 15 wins, 16 losses and 1 tie (15-16-1).

Bowl games

Bowl Appearances

Bowl Opponent Frequency

References
General

Specific

Arizona State

Arizona State Sun Devils bowl games